

Events

Pre-1600
787 – Second Council of Nicaea: The council assembles at the church of Hagia Sophia.
1568 – Spanish naval forces defeat an English fleet, under the command of John Hawkins, at the Battle of San Juan de Ulúa near Veracruz.

1601–1900
1645 – The Battle of Rowton Heath in England is a Parliamentarian victory over a Royalist army commanded in person by King Charles.
1674 – Second Tantrik Coronation of Shivaji.
1745 – Jacobite rising of 1745: Bonnie Prince Charles defeats a British government army in the Battle of Prestonpans.
1789 – The United States Congress passes the Judiciary Act, creating the office of the Attorney General and federal judiciary system and ordering the composition of the Supreme Court.
1830 – A revolutionary committee of notables forms the Provisional Government of Belgium.
1841 – The Sultanate of Brunei cedes Sarawak to James Brooke.
1846 – Mexican–American War: General Zachary Taylor captures Monterrey. 
1852 – The first powered, passenger-carrying airship, the Giffard dirigible, travels  from Paris to Trappes.
1853 – Admiral Despointes formally takes possession of New Caledonia in the name of France. 
1869 – Black Friday (1869): Gold prices plummet after United States President Grant orders the Treasury to sell large quantities of gold after Jay Gould and James Fisk plot to control the market.
1877 – The Battle of Shiroyama is a decisive victory of the Imperial Japanese Army over the Satsuma Rebellion.
1890 – The Church of Jesus Christ of Latter-day Saints officially renounces polygamy.

1901–present
1906 – U.S. President Theodore Roosevelt proclaims Devils Tower in Wyoming as the nation's first National Monument.
  1906   – Racial tensions exacerbated by rumors lead to the Atlanta Race Riot, further increasing racial segregation.
1911 – His Majesty's Airship No. 1, Britain's first rigid airship, is wrecked by strong winds before her maiden flight at Barrow-in-Furness.
1929 – Jimmy Doolittle performs the first flight without a window, proving that full instrument flying from take off to landing is possible.
1932 – Gandhi and Dr. Ambedkar agree to the Poona Pact, which reserved seats in the Indian provincial legislatures for the "Depressed Classes" (Untouchables).
1935 – Earl and Weldon Bascom produce the first rodeo ever held outdoors under electric lights.
1946 – Cathay Pacific Airways is founded in Hong Kong.
  1946   – The top-secret Clifford-Elsey Report on the Soviet Union is delivered to President Truman.
1948 – The Honda Motor Company is founded.
1950 – The eastern United States is covered by a thick haze from the Chinchaga fire in western Canada.
1957 – President Eisenhower sends the 101st Airborne Division to Little Rock, Arkansas, to enforce desegregation.
1959 – TAI Flight 307 crashes during takeoff from Bordeaux–Mérignac Airport in Bordeaux, Nouvelle-Aquitaine, France, killing 55 people.
1960 – , the world's first nuclear-powered aircraft carrier, is launched.
1972 – Japan Airlines Flight 472 lands at Juhu Aerodrome instead of Santacruz Airport in Bombay, India.
1973 – Guinea-Bissau declares its independence from Portugal.
1975 – Southwest Face expedition members become the first persons to reach the summit of Mount Everest by any of its faces, instead of using a ridge route.
1993 – The Cambodian monarchy is restored, with Norodom Sihanouk as king. 
1996 – Representatives of 71 nations sign the Comprehensive Nuclear-Test-Ban Treaty at the United Nations.
2005 – Hurricane Rita makes landfall in the United States, devastating portions of southwestern Louisiana and extreme southeastern Texas.
2007 – Between 30,000 and 100,000 people take part in anti-government protests in Yangon, Burma, the largest in 20 years.
2008 – Thabo Mbeki resigns as president of South Africa. 
2009 – The G20 summit begins in Pittsburgh with 30 global leaders in attendance.
  2009   – SA Airlink Flight 8911 crashes near Durban International Airport in Durban, South Africa, killing the captain and injuring the rest of the crew.
2013 – A 7.7-magnitude earthquake strikes southern Pakistan, killing at least 327 people.
2014 – The Mars Orbiter Mission makes India the first Asian nation to reach Mars orbit, and the first nation in the world to do so in its first attempt.
2015 – At least 1,100 people are killed and another 934 wounded after a stampede during the Hajj in Saudi Arabia.

Births

Pre-1600
15 – Vitellius, Roman emperor (d. 69)
 936 – 'Adud al-Dawla, Buyid king (d. 983)
1301 – Ralph de Stafford, 1st Earl of Stafford, English soldier (d. 1372)
1418 – Anne of Cyprus, Duchess of Savoy (probable; d. 1462)
1433 – Shekha of Amarsar, Rajput chieftain (d. 1488)
1473 – Georg von Frundsberg, German Knight and landowner (d. 1528)
1501 – Gerolamo Cardano, Italian mathematician, physician, and astrologer (d. 1576)
1534 – Guru Ram Das, fourth Sikh Guru (d. 1581)
1564 – William Adams, English sailor and navigator (d. 1620)
1583 – Albrecht von Wallenstein, Bohemian general (d. 1634)

1601–1900
1625 – Johan de Witt, Dutch mathematician and politician (d. 1672)
1667 – Jean-Louis Lully, French composer (d. 1688)
1705 – Count Leopold Joseph von Daun, Austrian field marshal (d. 1766)
1717 – Horace Walpole, English historian, author, and politician (d. 1797)
1755 – John Marshall, American Continental Army officer, jurist, and politician, 4th Chief Justice of the United States Supreme Court (d. 1835)
1761 – F.L.Æ. Kunzen, German-Danish composer and conductor (d. 1817)
1796 – Antoine-Louis Barye, French sculptor and educator (d. 1875)
1801 – Mikhail Ostrogradsky, Ukrainian-Russian mathematician and physicist (d. 1862)
1802 – Adolphe d'Archiac, French paleontologist and geologist (d. 1868)
1812 – Mary Ann Browne, British poet and writer of musical scores (d. 1845)
1817 – Ramón de Campoamor y Campoosorio, Spanish poet and philosopher (d. 1901)
1829 – Charles S. West, American jurist and politician, Secretary of State of Texas (d. 1885)
1845 – Nikolai Anderson, Estonian philologist and author (d. 1905)
1858 – Eugene Foss, American businessman and politician, 45th Governor of Massachusetts (d. 1939)
1859 – Julius Klengel, German cellist and composer (d. 1933)
1861 – Bhikaiji Cama, Indian activist (d. 1936)
1870 – Georges Claude, French chemist and engineer, invented Neon lighting (d. 1960)
1871 – Lottie Dod, English tennis player, golfer, and archer (d. 1960)
1872 – Jaan Teemant, Estonian lawyer and politician, 7th State Elder of Estonia (d. 1941)
1873 – María de las Mercedes Adam de Aróstegui, Cuban pianist and composer (d. 1957)
1878 – Charles-Ferdinand Ramuz, Swiss author and poet (d. 1947)
1880 – Sarah Knauss, American super-centenarian, oldest verified American person ever (d. 1999)
1882 – Max Decugis, French tennis player (d. 1978)
1883 – Franklin Clarence Mars, American businessman, founded Mars, Incorporated (d. 1934)
  1883   – Lawson Robertson, Scottish-American high jumper and coach (d. 1951)
1884 – Gustave Garrigou, French cyclist (d. 1963)
  1884   – İsmet İnönü, Turkish general and politician, 2nd President of Turkey (d. 1973)
  1884   – Hugo Schmeisser, German weapons designer and engineer (d. 1953)
1885 – Artur Lemba, Estonian pianist, composer, and educator (d. 1963)
1890 – Mike González, Cuban baseball player, coach, and manager (d. 1977)
  1890   – A. P. Herbert, English author and playwright (d. 1971)
1892 – Adélard Godbout, Canadian agronomist and politician, 15th Premier of Québec (d. 1956)
1893 – Blind Lemon Jefferson, American singer-songwriter and guitarist (d. 1929)
1894 – Tommy Armour, Scottish-American golfer and sportscaster (d. 1968)
  1894   – Billy Bletcher, American actor, singer, and screenwriter (d. 1979)
1895 – André Frédéric Cournand, French physician and physiologist, Nobel Prize laureate (d. 1988)
1896 – F. Scott Fitzgerald, American novelist and short story writer (d. 1940)
1898 – Howard Florey, Australian pharmacologist and pathologist, Nobel Prize laureate (d. 1968)
  1898   – Charlotte Moore Sitterly, American astronomer (d. 1990)
1899 – William Dobell, Australian painter (d. 1970)
  1899   – Bessie Braddock, British politician (d. 1970)
1900 – Ham Fisher, American cartoonist (d. 1955)

1901–present
1901 – Alexandra Adler, Austrian neurologist and psychologist (d. 2001)
1905 – Severo Ochoa, Spanish–American physician and biochemist, Nobel Prize laureate (d. 1993)
1906 – Leonard Marsh, Canadian sociologist and academic (d. 1982)
  1906   – Józef Nawrot, Polish footballer (d. 1982)
1907 – Ben Oakland, American pianist, composer, and songwriter (d. 1979)
1909 – Gerard Antoni Ciołek, Polish historian and architect (d. 1966)
1910 – Jean Servais, Belgian-French actor (d. 1976)
1911 – Konstantin Chernenko, Soviet politician (d. 1985)
1912 – Robert Lewis Taylor, American author (d. 1998)
1913 – Herb Jeffries, American singer (d. 2014)
1914 – Esther Eng, Chinese-American film director (d. 1970)
  1914   – John Kerr, Australian politician, 18th Governor-General of Australia (d. 1991)
  1914   – Andrzej Panufnik, Polish pianist, composer, and conductor (d. 1991)
1916 – Ruth Leach Amonette, American businesswoman and author (d. 2004)
1918 – Michael J. S. Dewar, Indian-born American theoretical chemist who developed the Dewar–Chatt–Duncanson model (d. 1997)
  1918   – Audra Lindley, American actress (d. 1997)
1920 – Richard Bong, American soldier and pilot, Medal of Honor recipient (d. 1945)
  1920   – Jan Carew, Guyanese-American author, poet, and playwright (d. 2012)
  1920   – Ovadia Yosef, Iraqi-Israeli rabbi and scholar (d. 2013)
1921 – Jim McKay, American sportscaster and journalist (d. 2008)
  1921   – Sheila MacRae, English-American actress, singer, and dancer (d. 2014)
1922 – Ettore Bastianini, Italian actor and singer (d. 1967)
  1922   – Bert I. Gordon, American director, producer, and screenwriter (d. 2023)
  1922   – Theresa Merritt, American actress and singer (d. 1998)
  1922   – John Moffatt, English actor and playwright (d. 2012)
1923 – Louis Edmonds, American actor (d. 2001)
  1923   – Fats Navarro, American trumpet player and composer (d. 1950)
  1923   – Raoul Bott, Hungarian-American mathematician (d. 2005)
1924 – Nina Bocharova, Ukrainian gymnast (d. 2020)
  1924   – Voula Zouboulaki, Egyptian-Greek actress (d. 2015)
1925 – Autar Singh Paintal, Indian physiologist and academic (d. 2004)
1927 – Arthur Malet, English-American actor and singer (d. 2013)
1929 – John Carter, American clarinet player, saxophonist, and flute player (d. 1991)
1930 – Józef Krupiński, Polish poet and author (d. 1998)
  1930   – Angelo Muscat, Maltese-English actor (d. 1977)
  1930   – Benjamin Romualdez, Filipino politician and diplomat (d. 2012)
  1930   – John W. Young, American captain, engineer, and astronaut (d. 2018)
1931 – Elizabeth Blackadder, Scottish painter and printmaker (d. 2021)
  1931   – Cardiss Collins, American lawyer and politician (d. 2013)
  1931   – Brian Glanville, English journalist and author
  1931   – Anthony Newley, English singer and actor (d. 1999)
  1931   – Mike Parkes, English race car driver (d. 1977)
1932 – Miguel Montuori, Argentinian-Italian footballer and manager (d. 1998)
  1932   – Walter Wallmann, German politician, Minister-President of Hesse (d. 2013)
1933 – Raffaele Farina, Italian cardinal
  1933   – Mel Taylor, American drummer (d. 1996)
1934 – Tommy Anderson, Scottish footballer and manager
  1934   – John Brunner, English-Scottish author and screenwriter (d. 1995)
  1934   – John Kasmin, English art dealer
  1934   – Bernard Nevill, English painter, designer, and academic (d. 2019)
  1934   – Chick Willis, American singer and guitarist (d. 2013)
  1934   – Manfred Wörner, German politician and diplomat, 7th Secretary General of NATO (d. 1994)
  1934   – Donald Wrye, American director, screenwriter and producer (d. 2015)
1936 – Sivanthi Adithan, Indian businessman (d. 2013)
  1936   – Jim Henson, American puppeteer, director, producer and screenwriter, created The Muppets (d. 1990)
1938 – Steve Douglas, American saxophonist, flute player, and producer (d. 1993)
1939 – Wayne Henderson, American trombonist and producer (d. 2014)
  1939   – Moti Kirschenbaum, Israeli journalist (d. 2015)
  1939   – Jacques Vallée, French ufologist
1940 – Yves Navarre, French author (d. 1994)
1941 – John Mackey, American football player (d. 2011)
  1941   – Linda McCartney, American singer, photographer, and activist (d. 1998)
1942 – Gerry Marsden, English singer-songwriter and guitarist (d. 2021)
1944 – Eavan Boland, Irish poet and academic (d. 2020)
  1944   – Sven-Ole Thorsen, Danish bodybuilder and stuntman
  1944   – Victoria Vetri, Playboy's 1967 Miss September and 1968 Playmate of the Year.
1945 – Lou Dobbs, American journalist and author
  1945   – Carson Van Osten, American comics creator and musician (d. 2015)
  1945   – John Rutter, English composer, conductor, and producer
1946 – Jerry Donahue, American guitarist and producer
  1946   – Joe Greene, American football player, coach, and actor
  1946   – Lars Emil Johansen, Greenlandic educator and politician, 2nd Prime Minister of Greenland
  1946   – César Pedroso, Cuban pianist and songwriter 
  1946   – Pat Pocock, Welsh-English cricketer
  1946   – María Teresa Ruiz, Chilean astronomer
1947 – Stephen Mueller, American painter (d. 2011)
1948 – Phil Hartman, Canadian-American actor and screenwriter (d. 1998)
  1948   – Garth Porter, New Zealand-Australian singer-songwriter and producer 
1949 – Baleka Mbete, South African politician, Speaker of the National Assembly of South Africa
  1949   – Anders Arborelius, Swedish cardinal
1950 – Mohinder Amarnath, Indian cricketer, coach, and sportscaster
  1950   – John Kessel, American author, poet, and playwright
  1950   – Harriet Walter, English actress
1951 – Douglas Kmiec, American scholar and diplomat, United States Ambassador to Malta
1952 – Dieter Hochheimer, German footballer and manager
  1952   – Mark Sandman, American singer-songwriter, guitarist, and producer (d. 1999)
1954 – Marco Tardelli, Italian footballer and coach
1955 – Riccardo Illy, Italian businessman and politician, President of Friuli Venezia Giulia
1956 – Hubie Brooks, American baseball player
1957 – Wolfgang Wolf, German footballer and manager
1958 – Kevin Sorbo, American actor and producer
1959 – Theo Paphitis, Cypriot-English businessman 
  1959   – Steve Whitmire, American puppeteer
1960 – Amy Sky, Canadian singer-songwriter, producer, and actress
1961 – Christopher L. Eisgruber, American lawyer and academic
  1961   – John Logan, American screenwriter and producer
  1961   – Luc Picard, Canadian actor, director, and screenwriter
1962 – Ally McCoist, Scottish footballer and manager
  1962   – Mike Phelan, English footballer, coach, and manager
  1962   – Tim Supple, English director and producer
  1962   – Nia Vardalos, Canadian-American actress and screenwriter
  1962   – Ilgvars Zalāns, Latvian painter
1963 – Michael Potter, Australian rugby player and coach
  1963   – Ben Preston, English journalist
1964 – Rafael Palmeiro, Cuban-American baseball player
  1964   – Marko Pomerants, Estonian lawyer and politician, Estonian Minister of the Interior
  1964   – Ronald van der Kemp, Dutch fashion designer
1965 – Robert Irvine, English chef and television host
  1965   – Njål Ølnes, Norwegian saxophonist and composer 
  1965   – Sean McNabb, American singer and bass player 
  1965   – Janet Weiss, American drummer 
1966 – Christophe Bouchut, French race car driver
  1966   – Rajesh Khattar, Indian voice actor
  1966   – Bernard Gilkey, American baseball player
  1966   – Stefan Molyneux, Irish-Canadian philosopher, author, and blogger
  1966   – Michael O. Varhola, American journalist and author
1967 – Noreena Hertz, English economist, author, and academic
1969 – Shawn Crahan, American drummer, songwriter, and producer 
  1969   – Christopher Pincher, English politician
  1969   – Shamim Sarif, English author, director, and screenwriter
  1969   – Paul Ray Smith, American sergeant, Medal of Honor recipient (d. 2003)
  1969   – Megan Ward, American actress
1971 – Michael S. Engel, American paleontologist and entomologist
  1971   – Mike Michalowicz, American businessman and author 
  1971   – Kevin Millar, American baseball player and sportscaster
  1971   – Peter Salisbury, English drummer 
1972 – Conor Burns, British politician
  1972   – Kate Fleetwood, English actress
1973 – Eddie George, American football player and sportscaster
  1973   – Gillian Lindsay, Scottish rower
  1973   – Rodrick Rhodes, American basketball player and coach
1974 – John McDonald, American baseball player
1976 – Carlos Almeida, Angolan basketball player
  1976   – Stephanie McMahon, American wrestler and businesswoman
  1976   – Yakkun Sakurazuka, Japanese voice actress and singer (d. 2013)
  1976   – Vahur Vahtramäe, Estonian footballer
1977 – Frank Fahrenhorst, German footballer and manager
  1977   – Casey Rabach, American football player
1978 – Wietse van Alten, Dutch archer
1979 – Fábio Aurélio, Brazilian footballer
  1979   – Kim Jong-min, South Korean singer 
1980 – Daniele Bennati, Italian cyclist
  1980   – Dean Canto, Australian race car driver
  1980   – Petri Pasanen, Finnish footballer
  1980   – Victoria Pendleton, English cyclist
  1980   – John Arne Riise, Norwegian footballer
1981 – Ryan Briscoe, Australian race car driver
  1981   – Drew Gooden, American basketball player
1982 – Morgan Hamm, American gymnast
  1982   – Paul Hamm, American gymnast
  1982   – Jeff Karstens, American baseball player
1983 – Liam Finn, Australian-New Zealand singer-songwriter and guitarist
  1983   – Randy Foye, American basketball player
  1983   – Ben Harris, Australian rugby league player
1984 – Taylor Eigsti, American pianist and composer
  1984   – Senzo Meyiwa, South African footballer (d. 2014)
1985 – Eric Adjetey Anang, Ghanaian sculptor and carpenter
  1985   – Eleanor Catton, Canadian-New Zealand author
  1985   – Cameron Price, Australian news journalist
  1985   – Jonathan Soriano, Spanish footballer
1987 – Matthew Connolly, English footballer
  1987   – Gürhan Gürsoy, Turkish footballer
1988 – Karl Alzner, Canadian ice hockey player
1989 – Pia Wurtzbach, Filipina actress, model, and beauty queen, Miss Universe 2015
1991 – Maximiliano Uggè, Italian footballer
  1991   – Oriol Romeu, Spanish footballer
1993 – Ben Platt, American actor
1997 – Tosin Adarabioyo, English footballer
2002 – Jéssica Bouzas Maneiro, Spanish tennis player

Deaths

Pre-1600
 366 – Pope Liberius
 768 – Pepin the Short, Frankish king (b. 714)
 887 – Gao Pian, general of the Tang Dynasty (b. 821)
1054 – Hermann of Reichenau, German composer, mathematician, and astronomer (b. 1013)
1120 – Welf II, Duke of Bavaria (b. 1072)
1143 – Agnes of Germany (b. 1072)
  1143   – Pope Innocent II
1180 – Manuel I Komnenos, Byzantine emperor (b. 1118)
1218 – Robert of Knaresborough (b. 1160)
1228 – Stefan the First-Crowned, Serbian king (b. 1165)
1270 – Philip of Montfort, Lord of Castres
1275 – Humphrey de Bohun, 2nd Earl of Hereford, English politician, Lord High Constable of England (b. 1208)
1435 – Isabeau of Bavaria (b. 1370)
1459 – Eric of Pomerania, King of Norway, Denmark and Sweden (b. 1382)
1494 – Poliziano, Italian poet and scholar (b. 1454)
1534 – Michael Glinski, Lithuanian prince (b. c. 1470)
1541 – Paracelsus, German-Swiss physician, botanist, and chemist (b. 1493)
1545 – Albert of Mainz, German cardinal (b. 1490)
1562 – Henry Grey, 4th Earl of Kent, English politician (b. 1495)
1572 – Túpac Amaru, last of the Incas

1601–1900
1605 – Manuel Mendes, Portuguese composer and educator (b. 1547)
1621 – Jan Karol Chodkiewicz, Polish commander (b. 1560)
1646 – Duarte Lobo, Portuguese composer and educator (b. 1565)
1655 – Frederick, Landgrave of Hesse-Eschwege (b. 1617)
1707 – Vincenzo da Filicaja, Italian poet and author (b. 1642)
1732 – Emperor Reigen of Japan (b. 1654)
1742 – Johann Matthias Hase, German mathematician, astronomer, and cartographer (b. 1684)
1790 – John Keyse Sherwin, English engraver (b. 1751)
1802 – Alexander Radishchev, Russian author and critic (b. 1749)
1834 – Pedro I of Brazil (b. 1798)
1848 – Branwell Brontë, English painter and poet (b. 1817)
1863 – William Debenham, English businessman, founded Debenhams (b. 1794)
1889 – D. H. Hill, American general and academic (b. 1821)
  1889   – Charles Leroux, American balloonist and skydiver (b. 1856)
1892 – Patrick Gilmore, Irish-American soldier and composer (b. 1829)
1896 – Louis Gerhard De Geer, Swedish lawyer and politician, 1st Prime Minister of Sweden (b. 1818)

1901–present
1904 – Niels Ryberg Finsen, Faroese-Danish physician and author, Nobel Prize laureate (b. 1860)
1929 – Mahidol Adulyadej, Thai prince (b. 1892)
1930 – William A. MacCorkle, American lawyer and politician, 9th Governor of West Virginia (b. 1857)
1933 – Mike Donlin, American baseball player and actor (b. 1878)
  1933   – Alice Muriel Williamson, English author (b. 1869)
1936 – József Klekl, Slovene priest and journalist (b. 1879)
1938 – Lev Schnirelmann, Belarusian-Russian mathematician and academic (b. 1900)
1939 – Carl Laemmle, German-American film producer, founded Universal Studios (b. 1867)
  1939   – Charles Tatham, American fencer (b. 1854)
1945 – Hans Geiger, German physicist and academic, co-invented the Geiger counter (b. 1882)
1947 – Andrew C. McLaughlin, American historian and author (b. 1861)
1948 – Warren William, American actor (b. 1894)
1950 – Princess Victoria of Hesse and by Rhine (b. 1863)
1962 – Charles Reisner, American actor, director, and screenwriter (b. 1887)
1973 – August Kippasto, Estonian-Australian wrestler and poet (b. 1887)
  1973   – Josué de Castro, Brazilian physician, geographer, and activist (b. 1908)
1975 – Earle Cabell, American businessman and politician, Mayor of Dallas (b. 1906)
1976 – Philip Gbeho, Ghanaian composer and educator (b. 1904)
1978 – James Bassett, American journalist and author (b. 1912)
  1978   – Hasso von Manteuffel, German general and politician (b. 1897)
1980 – Theodor Luts, Estonian-Brazilian director, producer, and cinematographer (b. 1896)
1981 – Patsy Kelly, American actress and dancer (b. 1910)
1982 – Sarah Churchill, English actress (b. 1914)
  1982   – Józef Nawrot, Polish-English footballer (b. 1906)
1984 – Neil Hamilton, American actor (b. 1899)
1991 – Dr. Seuss, American children's book writer, poet, and illustrator (b. 1904)
1993 – Ian Stuart Donaldson, English singer-songwriter and guitarist (b. 1957)
  1993   – Bruno Pontecorvo, Italian physicist and academic (b. 1913)
1994 – Barry Bishop, American mountaineer, photographer, and scholar (b. 1932)
1996 – Zeki Müren, Turkish singer-songwriter (b. 1931)
1998 – Jeff Moss, American composer and screenwriter (b. 1942)
2002 – Youssouf Togoïmi, Chadian politician (b. 1953)
  2002   – Mike Webster, American football player (b. 1952)
2003 – Rosalie Allen, American singer and radio host (b. 1924)
  2003   – Lyle Bettger, American actor (b. 1915)
2004 – Françoise Sagan, French author and screenwriter (b. 1935)
2006 – Michael Ferguson, PIRA volunteer, lawyer, and politician (b. 1953)
  2006   – Phil Latulippe, Canadian soldier and runner (b. 1909)
2008 – Oliver Crawford, American screenwriter and author (b. 1917)
  2008   – Irene Dailey, American actress (b. 1920)
  2008   – Mickey Vernon, American baseball player and coach (b. 1918)
2009 – Nelly Arcan, Canadian author (b. 1975)
2010 – Gennady Yanayev, Russian engineer and politician, Vice President of the Soviet Union (b. 1937)
2012 – Pierre Adam, French cyclist (b. 1924)
  2012   – Bruno Bobak, Polish-Canadian painter and educator (b. 1923)
  2012   – Pedro Vázquez Colmenares, Mexican lawyer and politician, Governor of Oaxaca (b. 1934)
2013 – Paul Dietzel, American football player and coach (b. 1924)
  2013   – Margaret Feilman, Australian architect and urban planner (b. 1921)
  2013   – Boris Karvasarsky, Ukrainian-Russian psychiatrist and author (b. 1931)
  2013   – Anthony Lawrence, English-Hong Kong journalist and author (b. 1912)
  2013   – Sagadat Nurmagambetov, Kazakh general and politician (b. 1924)
  2013   – Paul Oliver, American football player (b. 1984)
2014 – Deborah Cavendish, Duchess of Devonshire, English aristocrat, socialite, and author (b. 1920)
  2014   – Christopher Hogwood, English harpsichord player and conductor, founded the Academy of Ancient Music (b. 1941)
  2014   – Madis Kõiv, Estonian physicist, philosopher, and author (b. 1929)
2015 – Alan Moore, Australian painter and educator (b. 1914)
  2015   – Wang Zhongshu, Chinese archaeologist and academic (b. 1925)
2016 – Mel Charles, Welsh footballer (b. 1935)
  2016   – Vladimir Kuzmichyov, Russian footballer (b. 1979)
  2016   – Bill Mollison, Australian researcher, author and biologist (b. 1928)
  2016   – Bill Nunn, American actor (b. 1953)
  2016   – Buckwheat Zydeco, American accordionist and bandleader (b. 1947)
2020 – Dean Jones, Australian cricketer, coach and commentator (b. 1961)

Holidays and observances
Armed Forces Day (Peru)
Christian feast day:
Anathalon (in Brescia)
Antonio Gonzalez
Blessed Émilie Gamelin (Canada)
Gerard of Csanád
Our Lady of Mercy and its related observance:
La Mercè (Barcelona)
Our Lady of Ransom (Mercedarians)
Our Lady of Walsingham (Church of England)
Pacificus of San Severino
Rupert of Salzburg
September 24 (Eastern Orthodox liturgics).
Constitution Day (Cambodia)
Earliest day on which Maple Leaf Day can fall, while September 30 is the latest; celebrated on the last Wednesday in September. (Canada)
Heritage Day (South Africa)
Independence Day, celebrates the independence of Guinea-Bissau from Portugal in 1973.
Mahidol Day (Thailand)
New Caledonia Day (New Caledonia)
Republic Day (Trinidad and Tobago)

References

External links

 
 
 

Days of the year
September